St Andrew St John, 14th Baron St John of Bletso PC FRS (22 August 1759 – 15 October 1817) was an English politician who sat in the British House of Commons from 1780 until 1806 when he inherited a peerage.

St John was born at Woodford, Northamptonshire, the son of John St John, 12th Baron St John of Bletso and his wife Susanna Louisa Simond, daughter of Peter Simond. He was educated by the Rev. John Skynner at Easton near Stamford. He was then admitted at Lincoln's Inn on 7 May 1773 and at St John's College, Cambridge in 1776.  He was awarded MA in 1779 and was called to the bar on 29 January 1782.

In 1780, St John was elected Member of Parliament for Bedfordshire. He was a personal friend of Charles James Fox, who supported him throughout his political career. He was Under-Secretary of State for Foreign Affairs to Lord North for a short time in 1783 but otherwise was generally very active in opposition. In April 1784, he was unseated on petition in favour of Robert Henley-Ongley, Baron Ongley but reversed the situation when Ongley was unseated on his petition on 19 May 1785. In 1787, he was one of the managers of the Impeachment of Warren Hastings. He was Captain of the Bedford Volunteers in 1803.

St Andrew became the 14th Lord St John of Bletsoe when his brother Henry died in 1805, and so resigned his seat in the Commons. As a peer he accepted a Privy Councillorship in 1806. Also in 1806 he became Captain of the Gentlemen Pensioners until 1807 and Lt-Colonel of the Bedford Volunteers until 1808. In 1808 he became a Fellow of the Royal Society and Fellow of the Society of Antiquaries.

St John married Louisa Boughton, 30 years his junior at St George Hanover Square on 16 July 1807. She was the daughter of Sir Charles William Rouse-Boughton, 9th Baronet and Catherine Pearce Hall. St John was then nearly 50 and had a long parliamentary career behind him in which he would have been on the opposite side in most cases to Louisa's father. They lived at Melchbourne Park, Bedfordshire, and had two children, St Andrew and Louisa (born posthumously) who married Norman Macleod 25th Chief. Lord St John died at the age of 58, leaving Louisa a widow with a young family. She married again to Mr Serjeant Vaughan on 11 August 1828. They had a son, Rev. Charles Lyndhurst Vaughan, and a daughter, Edith, who married Sir Charles Isham, 10th Baronet.

References

 Namier and Brooke History of Parliament:The Commons, 1754-1790
 R G Thorne History of Parliament:The Commons, 1790-1820
 Burke's Baronetage & Peerage

External links 
Bedford Borough Council Community Archives – The St John Family
 

1759 births
1817 deaths
Alumni of St John's College, Cambridge
Members of the Parliament of Great Britain for English constituencies
British MPs 1780–1784
British MPs 1784–1790
British MPs 1790–1796
British MPs 1796–1800
Members of the Parliament of the United Kingdom for English constituencies
UK MPs 1801–1802
UK MPs 1802–1806
UK MPs who inherited peerages
St Andrew
Fellows of the Royal Society
Fellows of the Society of Antiquaries of London
Barons St John of Bletso